Chittagong–Cox's Bazar line is a railway line under Bangladesh Railway. It is operated by East Zone of Bangladesh.

History
The Assam Bengal Railway completed the construction of the Chittagong–Sholosohor railway line in 1929. The following year they constructed a railway line from Sholosahar Junction to Nazirhat and in 1931, the following year, another railway line was constructed from the same junction to Dohazari. In 2010, a railway construction project was taken up from Dohazari to Cox's Bazar via Ramu. The length of railway line under construction is 128 km. A target was then taken to complete the project within 3 years of initiation which was later extended by another 5 years till 2018. However, the contractor is appointed in the year preceding the target year. The construction of the railway line started in July 2018.

Ramu–Ghumdhum section
Construction of a railway track from Dohazari to Cox's Bazar has been initiated.  Thereafter, it is proposed to be extended to Ghumdhum on the Bangladesh–Myanmar border for linking with Myanmar Railways as part of Trans-Asian Railway.

References

Railway lines opened in 1929
Proposed railway lines in Asia
Dual gauge railways in Bangladesh
Chittagong District
Cox's Bazar District